Ravnets (also transcribed at Ravnetz or Ravnec) is a village  in Burgas Municipality in southeastern Bulgaria.

References

Villages in Burgas Province